Hydropisphaera is a genus of fungi in the class Sordariomycetes. It consists of 18 species.

References

Sordariomycetes genera
Bionectriaceae
Taxa named by Barthélemy Charles Joseph Dumortier